Where Was I? was an American panel show which aired on the DuMont Television Network Tuesdays at 9pm ET from September 2, 1952, to October 6, 1953.

The series consisted of panelists would have to guess a location by listening to clues and viewing photos. Hosts included Dan Seymour, Ken Roberts, and John Reed King, and panelists included Bill Cullen, Nancy Guild, Virginia Graham, and Skitch Henderson.

Episode status
As with most DuMont series, no episodes are known to exist.

See also
List of programs broadcast by the DuMont Television Network
List of surviving DuMont Television Network broadcasts
1952-53 United States network television schedule

Bibliography
David Weinstein, The Forgotten Network: DuMont and the Birth of American Television (Philadelphia: Temple University Press, 2004) 
Alex McNeil, Total Television, Fourth edition (New York: Penguin Books, 1980) 
Tim Brooks and Earle Marsh, The Complete Directory to Prime Time Network TV Shows, Third edition (New York: Ballantine Books, 1964)

External links
Where Was I? at IMDB
DuMont historical website

DuMont Television Network original programming
Black-and-white American television shows
1952 American television series debuts
1953 American television series endings
Lost television shows
1950s American game shows
English-language television shows
Television game shows with incorrect disambiguation